Kathy Malloch is an American nurse who is past president and current boardmember of the Arizona Board of Nursing. She is a nursing scholar, writer, software developer and teacher.

Education 
A graduate of Wayne State University, College of Nursing, she received an MBA from Oakland University and a PhD in nursing from the University of Colorado.

Career

Her textbook Quantum Leadership co-authored with Tim Porter-O’Grady received the AJN Book of the Year award in 2005 and Managing Success in Healthcare received that honor in 2008. Together with Porter O'Grady she has co-authored six books on healthcare leadership, innovation, and evidence-based practice.

Malloch is a clinical professor with the College of Nursing and Healthcare Innovation at Arizona State University.  She is the program director of the Masters in Healthcare Innovation program. Her area of study at Arizona State University is the diffusion of innovations and technology adoption in healthcare.

Malloch is the developer of Expert Nurse Estimation Patient Classification System, or ENEPCS, an automated system that measures clinical workload and provides the number of hours and skill mix required to meet patient needs.

Publications 
 Porter-O’Grady, T. & Malloch, K. (2007). Managing for Success in Healthcare; St. Louis: Elsevier.
 Porter-O’Grady, T. & Malloch, K. (2007). (2nd Ed.). Quantum Leadership: A resource for health care innovation. Sudbury, MA; Jones & Bartlett.
 Malloch, K. & Porter-O’Grady. (2006). An Introduction to Evidence Based Practice for nursing and Healthcare. Sudbury, MA: Jones & Bartlett.
 Malloch, K. & Krueger, J. (2005). Patient Classification Systems chapter in Dunham-Taylor, J. & Pinczuk, J.Z. Health Care Financial Management for Nurse Managers: Merging the heart with the dollar.  Sudbury, MA: Jones and Bartlett.

See also 
Technology adoption

External links 
 ASU biography
 http://www.bizjournals.com/milwaukee/stories/2008/03/24/daily13.html
 http://enepcs.com/index.php
 https://web.archive.org/web/20090709000720/https://www.azbn.gov/BoardMembers.aspx

Living people
Wayne State University alumni
Oakland University alumni
University of Colorado alumni
Arizona State University faculty
Year of birth missing (living people)